Venkatesham is a surname. Notable people with the surname include: 

Burra Venkatesham (born 1968), Indian author
Vinai Venkatesham, British football administrator

Indian surnames